Michael Santiago Render (born April 20, 1975), better known by his stage name Killer Mike, is an American rapper, actor, and activist. Mike made his debut on Outkast's 2000 LP Stankonia, and later appeared on their Grammy-winning single "The Whole World" from their greatest hits album Big Boi and Dre Present... Outkast (2001). He has since released five full-length albums as a solo artist. He is the founder of Grind Time Official Records, which he launched through SMC and Fontana Distribution. 

In December 2008, Mike signed to fellow Atlanta-based rapper T.I.'s Grand Hustle Records. In 2012, he released R.A.P. Music, produced entirely by rapper and producer El-P. Killer Mike and El-P subsequently formed the duo Run the Jewels in 2013; they were signed to Fool's Gold Records and released their self-titled debut in June of that year.

Mike is also known as a social and political activist, focusing on subjects including social inequality, police brutality, and systemic racism. In addition to addressing themes of racism and police brutality in his music, he has also delivered several lectures at colleges and universities, written about social justice topics for publications such as Billboard, and been the subject of interviews regarding police misconduct and race relations. He was a visible and vocal supporter of Bernie Sanders' 2016 U.S. presidential campaign, refusing to support Hillary Clinton after Sanders left the race, and again supporting Sanders in his 2020 presidential campaign.

Mike has appeared in films such as Idlewild, Baby Driver, and ATL. The documentary series Trigger Warning with Killer Mike, in which he explores issues in the U.S. that affect the black community, premiered on Netflix in January 2019.

Early life
Michael Render was born in the Adamsville neighborhood of Atlanta, Georgia, on April 20, 1975, the son of a policeman father and a florist mother. Because his parents were teenagers at the time of his birth, he was partly raised by his grandparents in the Collier Heights neighborhood of Atlanta, and would attend Douglass High School.

Career

1995–2005: Early career
In 1995, Killer Mike briefly attended Atlanta's Morehouse College, where he met producers The Beat Bullies and eventually Big Boi of Outkast. His music debut was a feature appearance on Outkast's "Snappin' & Trappin'" from the 2000 album Stankonia, followed by their 2001 single "The Whole World", which won the 2002 Grammy Award for Best Rap Performance by a Duo or Group. He was featured on several other tracks that year, including "Poppin' Tags" from Jay-Z's The Blueprint 2.

In 2003, Killer Mike released his debut studio album, Monster, while being managed by Dayo Adebiyi and Al Thrash of Own Music. The album's lead single was "Akshon (Yeah!)", which featured Outkast on guest vocals. A remix of "Akshon (Yeah!)" was included on the soundtrack of EA Sports' video game Madden NFL 2004. The album's second single was "A.D.I.D.A.S.", featuring Big Boi and Sleepy Brown, which peaked at number 60 on the US Billboard Hot 100. It is Killer Mike's highest-charting single to date as a lead artist.

Following the release of his own material, he appeared on "Flip Flop Rock" and "Bust" on the Speakerboxx half of OutKast's Speakerboxxx/The Love Below double album. He appeared on "Southern Takeover" with Pastor Troy on Chamillionaire's album The Sound of Revenge. Killer Mike appeared alongside T.I. on the song "Never Scared" by Bone Crusher on his album AttenCHUN!. It peaked at #26 on the Hot 100, becoming Mike's second top 40 hit ("The Whole World" being the first). The song was used on the Madden NFL 2004 game soundtrack and by the Atlanta Braves for their 2003 season.

2006–2012: Pledge series and R.A.P. Music

What was to be his second album, Ghetto Extraordinary, had its release date pushed back several times due to disputes between Big Boi and Sony Records. Originally recorded in 2005, the album was eventually self-released as a mixtape in 2008.

Killer Mike's second album, I Pledge Allegiance to the Grind, was released on his own Grind Time Official label in 2006, followed by I Pledge Allegiance to the Grind II in 2008.

T.I. announced that he and Killer Mike had been in talks about bringing Mike to his Grand Hustle imprint on Atlantic, and Killer Mike confirmed that he had signed in December 2008. He released his fourth album, PL3DGE, on Grand Hustle in 2011. His fifth album, R.A.P. Music, followed in 2012.

In 2013, Killer Mike announced that he was working to release two albums in 2014, I Pledge Allegiance to the Grind IV and R.A.P. Music II, both of which were to feature production by El-P. Although neither album was released as planned, 2013 and 2014 did see the release of two Run the Jewels albums, both collaborative efforts between Killer Mike and El-P.

Killer Mike announced in 2013 that his next solo album would be titled Elegant Elephant, a project he described as his "Moby Dick". He did not specify a timeline for its release.

2013–present: Run the Jewels

Killer Mike was introduced to rapper-producer El-P by Cartoon Network executive Jason DeMarco in 2011. The following year, El-P produced Mike's album R.A.P. Music and guested on the song "Butane (Champion's Anthem)". That same year, Killer Mike guested on El-P's album Cancer 4 Cure. When R.A.P. Music and Cancer 4 Cure were released within weeks of each other, the two rappers decided to tour together. The success of the tour eventually led to the decision to record as a duo, which they named Run the Jewels.

Run the Jewels released a free eponymous album on June 26, 2013. The next year, on October 28, 2014, Run the Jewels released their second free album, Run the Jewels 2. On September 25, 2015, the duo released a re-recorded version of Run the Jewels 2 made entirely with cat sounds, titled Meow the Jewels. A third album, Run the Jewels 3, was released on December 24, 2016. Their fourth album, RTJ4, was released on June 3, 2020.

On July 4, 2022, Mike released a solo single, "Run".

Other ventures

Acting
Mike has been featured in the films 20 Funerals, Idlewild (2006), and ATL (2006). He has performed as a voice actor, playing a rapper/actor-turned-U.S. President named Taqu'il in the Adult Swim cartoon Frisky Dingo from 2006 to 2008. Mike guest-voiced a Boost Mobile phone in an episode of the same name of Adult Swim's Aqua Teen Hunger Force. He appeared twice on an Adult Swim surreal comedy series The Eric Andre Show, once in 2012, where he acted as a hype man for a female opera singer, and again in 2014, where he performed a rap battle with Action Bronson while the two were forced to walk on treadmills. He appeared as himself in Ozark (season 4 episode 8).

Graffitis SWAG barbershop
Mike and his wife, Shana, opened a barbershop in Atlanta on November 1, 2011. The two acquired and reworked a barbershop and named it Graffitis SWAG (shave, wash, and groom). He had waited nine years before choosing to open the barbershop, after having an early business manager advise him against the plan. It took his wife advising him to do it now while he had the time and money to pursue his lifelong dream. He eventually plans to open 150 shops across the United States over time, predominantly in cities with large Black communities.

The barbershop is decorated with artwork on the walls honoring historic Black leaders, including Martin Luther King Jr. Mike said that he hopes to "lift up men in the community who are out of work and help move them toward sustainable, lifelong careers" and give his employees "opportunity for real economic elevation". As of 2012, the shop employed six barbers, with plans to add four to six more licensed barbers to the team. Mike said that he hoped to pursue his own barber license in the winter of 2012.

The enterprise has been successful and the shop has become a gathering place for the community, in addition to hosting events such as a season premiere for The Boondocks and serving as the setting for several music videos. A second location in Tampa, Florida was planned for 2014.

Greenwood bank
In October 2020, Killer Mike, Bounce TV founder Ryan Glover, and former Atlanta mayor Andrew Young founded Greenwood, an online bank targeting "Black and Latinx communities and anyone else who wants to support Black-owned businesses." According to Glover "tens of thousands" of people were on its waitlist for accounts within a day, and on January 26 Greenwood reported 500,000 people were waiting for accounts. The bank was originally expected to open in January 2021, but delayed its opening first to July, and then to the end of 2021, due to "unanticipated high demand".

Activism
Mike is an outspoken social activist focusing on subjects including social equality, police brutality, and systemic racism. His views are reflected in his music, as well as in interviews with the media. As a publicly viewed figure, Mike feels it is his responsibility to represent African-Americans: "I feel I have to be politically active and I have to be a credit to my race." He has been vocal on the subject of police misconduct, his father being a former police officer. His anti-brutality sentiment can be found on the song "Reagan" from his album R.A.P. Music, and the song "Early" on Run the Jewels 2.

In response to the 2014 shooting of Michael Brown controversy in Ferguson, Missouri, Mike said:

In an op-ed published in Billboard magazine, Killer Mike stated that "there is no reason that Mike Brown and also Eric Garner are dead today—except bad policing, excessive force, and the hunt-and-capture-prey mentality many thrill-seeking cops have adapted".

Mike and El-P performed at The Ready Room in St. Louis, Missouri on November 24, 2014, the same night that the Grand Jury verdict was announced stating that Darren Wilson would not be charged with a crime in the shooting of Michael Brown. Mike opened the set, which began about two hours after the announcement was made, with a heartfelt speech. Fan-shot footage of the speech later went viral.

Mike, in an op-ed, defended rap lyrics and says that they should be defended as freedom of speech.

Commenting on the 2015 Baltimore uprising related to the death of Freddie Gray, Killer Mike noted that he understood the frustrations leading to violent demonstrations, but encouraged protesters to use their energy to organize for lasting change. In a Billboard op-ed, Mike stated:

He made similar points in an interview with the Harvard Political Review: "Baltimore is an opportunity for us to do something different. As society, there's a real opportunity to organize there, and if we do not take full advantage of the opportunity to organize, then the riots truly meant nothing."

Mike has given lectures about race relations in the United States at several American universities, including Northwestern University, New York University and the Massachusetts Institute of Technology.

Political involvement

In June 2015, Mike briefly ran as a write-in candidate to become the representative for Georgia's 55th district in the Georgia House of Representatives. Despite encouraging voters to write in his real name, Michael Render, any votes he received would not have been considered valid due to his failure to previously register as an official candidate in the election. He said his purpose in running was to raise awareness of the special election, and to demonstrate that political outsiders can and should run against established politicians.

Mike announced his support of Democratic U.S. presidential candidate Bernie Sanders in June 2015 after Sanders announced his intention to restore the Voting Rights Act of 1965. After introducing Sanders at a rally held in Atlanta November 23, 2015, Mike spent time recording an interview with the presidential candidate at Mike's barbershop. Mike released his interview with Sanders as a six-part video series the following month. In the following months, he remained an active and vocal supporter of Sanders, delivering speeches at rallies, voicing support in televised interviews and on social media, and traveling with the campaign. Sanders introduced Run the Jewels before their appearance at the 2016 Coachella music festival.

In February 2016, Mike received criticism during his activism for Sanders for quoting American anti-racism and LGBT advocate Jane Elliott regarding Hillary Clinton, which was criticized as misogynistic and mistakenly attributed as being his original phrasing online and in the press. Following Sanders' exit from the race, Mike refused to support Clinton, citing her pro-war record.

Mike has been an advocate for investment in black-owned banks; in July 2016, he called for people to transfer their money to black-owned Atlanta bank Citizens Trust, stating, "We don't have to burn our city down. But what we can do is go to your banks tomorrow. You can go to your bank tomorrow. And you can say, 'Until you as a corporation start to speak on our behalf, I want all my money. And I'm taking all my money to Citizens Trust."

In June 2017, at Glastonbury festival, Mike endorsed Labour Party leader Jeremy Corbyn in the 2017 UK general election.

On March 22, 2018, Mike appeared on NRATV with host Colion Noir defending Black gun ownership. He says it had been filmed a week prior to the March for Our Lives yet released the weekend of the protest. He stated that he told his children that if they participated in the National School Walkout that he would expect them to leave the family home. On March 26, 2018, he posted a video stating that the NRA used his interview out of context, saying he actually supports March for Our Lives while simultaneously advocating for Black gun ownership. During this same video he gave his endorsement for gun ownership alternatives, listing the Socialist Rifle Association by name.

On May 29, 2020, Mike spoke during a press conference with Atlanta mayor Keisha Lance Bottoms in response to the murder of George Floyd and the ensuing protests.

In 2020, Mike supported both Raphael Warnock and Jon Ossoff in the 2020–2021 United States Senate special election in Georgia, both of whom won. He would again endorse Warnock in the 2022 United States Senate election in Georgia.

Personal life
Mike married his wife, Shana, in 2006. He has four children.

Discography

Studio albums 
 Monster (2003)
 I Pledge Allegiance to the Grind (2006)
 I Pledge Allegiance to the Grind II (2008)
 PL3DGE (2011)
 R.A.P. Music (2012)

Filmography

Awards

Grammy Awards

|-
|2003
|"The Whole World" (with Outkast)
|Best Rap Performance By a Duo or Group
|
|-
|}

Billboard Awards
In 2020, Killer Mike was the recipient of the first Billboard Change Maker Award, created to recognize an artist or group that speaks truth to power through their music and celebrity.

References

Further reading

External links

 
 

1975 births
21st-century American rappers
African-American male rappers
African-American songwriters
Alternative hip hop musicians
American gun rights activists
Articles containing video clips
Atlantic Records artists
Dungeon Family members
Grammy Award winners for rap music
Hip hop activists
Living people
Morehouse College alumni
Political music artists
Rappers from Atlanta
Songwriters from Georgia (U.S. state)
Southern hip hop musicians
Run the Jewels members
Purple Ribbon All-Stars members